Leona Maguire (born 30 November 1994) is an Irish professional golfer.

She was ranked 1st in the world on the women's World Amateur Golf Ranking from May 2015 until May 2016 and then from August 2016 until February 2018. Maguire's 135 weeks at the top is the longest in history.

She holds many other records including the lowest ever score in the final round of a major by any golfer, male or female, and the joint lowest round in the history of golf's major grand slam tournament rounds, both male and female, with a score of 61. She broke the all-time rookie points record in either the Solheim Cup or the Ryder Cup with a total of 4.5 points (2 points better than anybody else in the 2021 Solheim Cup), which helped Europe to narrowly win the cup 15–13. A native of County Cavan, at the age of 9, she gave up a promising swimming career to concentrate on golf. She is 15 minutes younger than her twin sister, Lisa Maguire, who was also a professional golfer and retired in 2019. On 5 February 2022 she made history by becoming the first Irish woman to win an event on the LPGA Tour, when she won the LPGA Drive On Championship by three strokes.

Amateur career
On 10 September 2005, she won the 10th HSBC British Wee Wonders Championship by 11 shots at the Balgove Course, St Andrews, Scotland, with a finishing round of 61. On 13 November she finished runner-up to her sister Lisa in the Young Masters Golf Junior Series at La Manga in Spain.

On 21 May 2008, she won the Lancome Irish Women's Amateur Close Championship at Westport, County Mayo.

In January 2011, Maguire won the Portuguese International Ladies Amateur Championship by 15 strokes.  Later that same year, Maguire won the Irish Women's Open Stroke Play Championship.

2012
On 22 April, Maguire became the first Irish golfer to win the Irish Girls Open Strokeplay championship, held at Roganstown Golf Club. She beat an international field by eight shots. On 10 June, she was part of the Great Britain & Ireland Curtis Cup team which defeated the US at Nairn, Scotland by 10.5 points to 9.5 points. On 20 June, Maguire won the Irish Women's Amateur Close Championship at the County Louth Golf Club, for the second time in her career.

2014
Maguire left secondary school at Loreto College, Cavan in Ireland with top scholastic honours and joined Duke University in Durham, North Carolina, U.S. At Duke one of her classmates was the American professional basketball player, Grayson Allen.

2015
Maguire commenced the year in spectacular form in NCAA college golf, shooting up to first place in the World Amateur Golf Ranking by mid-May. In the Darius Rucker Intercollegiate held at Hilton Head, South Carolina, on 8 March, she came first with rounds of 73, 65, 69. In the ACC Championship held at Greensboro, North Carolina on 19 April, she won with rounds of 68, 68, 70. In the NCAA South Regional held at the Warren Golf course, South Bend, Indiana on 9 May, she won again with rounds of 72, 68, 72, thus helping Duke win the NCAA South Bend Regional title. On 6 May, she was voted the ACC (Atlantic Coast Conference) Player of the Year and ACC Freshman of the Year.

She was also picked for the ACC All-Star team. She also won ACC Golfer of the Month awards for both March and April. On 25 May, she won the 2015 Annika Award for the best golfer of the year in American college women's golf. On 20 May, she was chosen as a member of the South Bend Region All-Star team.

On 26 May, Leona was honoured both as the WGCA Player of the Year and Freshman of the Year for 2015 and was also chosen on the 2015 WGCA All-American team. She was also the recipient of the 2014–15 Golfstat Cup presented to the player who has the best scoring average. Maguire's stroke average of 70.78 was the best in the history of Duke University women's golf. She also tied the Duke record of 24 par rounds or better in a season and tied the Duke record for most wins in a season with three.

At the British Ladies Amateur held at Portstewart, County Londonderry, Northern Ireland on 11–13 June, Maguire won the stroke play part of the competition, finishing 6 strokes ahead of the field with rounds of 67, 68. She also helped Ireland to win the international team event.

On 25 June, Maguire was named on the 2015 All-ACC Academic Team which recognises academic excellence as well as athletic excellence. In June Maguire won the Golfweek National Player of the Year award and also was selected to Golfweek First Team All-America. On 6 July Maguire was named on the WGCA 2015 All-American Scholar Team. On 27 July, Maguire represented Great Britain & Ireland in the Vagliano Trophy against Europe, held at Malone Golf Club, Belfast, Northern Ireland. Europe won 12 1/2 points to 11 1/2. Maguire was undefeated, contributing 3 1/2 points of the GB & Ireland total.

Maguire was invited as a guest amateur to play in the European Ladies Tour's ISPS Handa Ladies European Masters held at Buckinghamshire Golf Club, Denham, England on 2–5 July. Maguire stunned the professionals by finishing second, just one shot off the lead with rounds of 69, 70, 69, 69. As an amateur Maguire could not accept the 2nd place prize money of €50,000.  In her last seven stroke play competitions, she finished 1st, 3rd, 1st, 1st, 2nd, 1st and 2nd. On 20 August 2015, Maguire was awarded the Mark H. McCormack Medal given annually to the number one ranked female amateur player in the world. Maguire was invited to play in the fifth and final major of the year, The Evian Championship held at Evians Golf Club, Evian Les Bains, France, on 10–13 September.

Maguire finished as leading amateur and became the first woman ever from the Republic of Ireland to make the cut in a major. As an amateur Maguire could not accept her prize money of €18,648, meaning she has forfeited over €68,000 in prize money in 2015. Although still an amateur and having only played a couple of professional tournaments in 2015, Maguire was ranked in the top 300 of the Women's World Golf Rankings. In September Maguire was awarded the European Ladies' Amateur Golf Ranking's gold medal.

2016

On 12 June 2016 at Dún Laoghaire Golf Club, Maguire was part of the Great Britain & Ireland team which defeated the US in an 11½ to 8½ win in the 2016 Curtis Cup. She contributed 4 points to the winning total. On 21 June, Maguire was selected on the All-ACC Academic Team for the second year in a row. In June, Maguire was selected to Golfweek First Team All-America for the second straight season. On 5 Jul,y Maguire was selected for the 2015-16 WGCA All-American Scholars Team which recognises academic excellence as well as athletic excellence, for the second year in a row.

On 31 July at the Woburn Golf and Country Club in England, Maguire won the Smyth Salver when she finished as the leading amateur at the Ricoh Women's British Open, one of the major championships. As an amateur, she forfeited her 25th place prize money of $25,500, after rounds of 71, 70, 68, 75. In the last 12 months, she forfeited over $100,000 in prize money as a result of her amateur status, despite playing only a handful of professional tournaments. As a result of the points earned at the British Open, she regained her world number one amateur ranking on 3 August 2016.

On 15 August 2016, Maguire was awarded the Mark H. McCormack Medal given annually to the number one ranked female amateur player in the world. This is the second successive season Maguire has won the award. On 20 August Maguire finished 21st overall and was the leading amateur at the Rio Olympics Women's Golf for a two under par total of 282, with scores of 74, 65, 74, 69.

On 17 September, Maguire helped Ireland to a third place bronze medal in the 2016 Espirito Santo Trophy held at Mayakoka El Camaleon Golf Club in Mexico. Maguire finished in a tie for 6th place in the individual rankings with rounds of 72, 70, 71, 69 for a 6-under-par total of 282. On 28 September, Maguire was awarded the European Ladies' Amateur Golf Ranking's gold medal for the second successive year. On 2 November, she helped Duke win the East Lake Cup held at East Lake Golf Club in Atlanta, Georgia, USA, beating Washington State in the final. On 28 November, Maguire was chosen as a member of the Global Golf Post All-Star amateur team of 2016.

On 3 August, Maguire announced she would turn professional after the Brazil Olympics and would enter the LPGA Tour qualifying school in October. After successfully completing stage II at qualifying school, Maguire withdrew prior to stage III and stated she would return to Duke.

2017

Maguire was selected as ACC Golfer of the Month for April 2017, which is the sixth time she has won the monthly award in her college golf career.

On 11 May, Maguire was voted the ACC Women's Golfer of the Year for the second time in her career and was also selected for the All-ACC Women's Golf Team for the third year in a row. Also on 11 May Maguire was selected for the College Sports Information Directors of America Academic All-District III Women's At-Large Team, which recognises the nation's top student-athletes for their combined performances athletically and in the classroom.

On 23 May, Maguire was named the USA Women's Golf Coaches Association (WGCA) National Player of the Year for the second time in three years and became just the fifth player in history to win the award multiple times. She was also selected for the WGCA First Team All-Americans.

On 24 May, Maguire was awarded the 2016-17 GolfStat Cup which is presented to the player with the best scoring average versus par with at least 20 full rounds played during a season. It was the second time in her career to win the cup. Maguire also finished in first place on the Golfweek/Sagarin women's college end of season rankings. On 8 June Maguire won the Annika Award for the second time, becoming the only person to win it twice. She was also selected on the CoSIDA Academic All-America® Division I Women's At-Large Team, only the second Duke golfer in history to be so.

On 17 June, Maguire won the British Ladies Amateur Golf Championship for the first time, beating Ainhoa Olarra of Spain 3 & 2 in the matchplay final held at the  Pyle & Kenfig Golf Club, Waun-y-Mer, Wales. On 25 June, Maguire was named the ACC Women's Golf Scholar-Athlete of the Year and was also named to the All-ACC Academic Team for the third year in a row.

On 28 June, Maguire won the Golfweek National Player of the Year award for the second time in her career and was also selected to Golfweek First Team All-America for the third straight season. On 6 July, Maguire represented Great Britain & Ireland in the Vagliano Trophy against Europe, held at Circolo Golf Bogogno, Italy. Europe won 15 points to 9. Maguire contributed 1 point of the GB & Ireland total.

On 5 July, Maguire was selected for the Women's Golf Coaches Association (WGCA) All-American Scholars Team for the third year in a row. On 10 July Maguire was awarded the 2017 Edith Cummings Munson Golf Award by the Women's Golf Coaches Association (WGCA). She is only the second golfer in history to win both the Edith Cummings Munson Golf Award and the WGCA Player of the Year in the same season. On 6 August, at the Kingsbarns Golf Links, Scotland, Maguire made the cut and was runner-up for the Smyth Salver awarded to the leading amateur at the Ricoh Women's British Open, one of the major professional championships, after rounds of 69, 71, 70, 75.

On 15 August 2017, Maguire was awarded the Mark H. McCormack Medal given annually to the number one ranked female amateur golf player in the world. This is the third successive season Maguire has won the award thus equalling the all-time record holder Lydia Ko.

On 12 September, Maguire began the 2017-2018 College Golf season by winning the Jim West Challenge at The Fazio Course at The Club at Carlton Woods, The Woodlands, Texas, USA. Her rounds of 67, 63, 70 for a total of 200 included the lowest round of her career, a 63, which is the second lowest round in the history of Duke University, one  stroke behind Liz Janangelo's 62. Maguire's 36-hole and 54-hole totals of 130 & 200 also broke the Duke all-time scoring records for two and three rounds. Her 13-under par total of 200 also broke the tournament all-time record. She also helped Duke win the team title at the tournament as well as setting a new school team scoring record of 33-under par total of 819. Duke also set a new Jim West Challenge tournament record for under par (-33) and 54-hole score (819). This is Maguire's fifth title of the calendar year 2017.player - Jim West Challenge

On 22 October, Maguire qualified to play in the professional Symetra Tour in 2018 by finishing in ninth place at the LPGA Qualifying Tournament (Stage II) with rounds of 70, 69, 70, 72. She finished as the second highest amateur. On 9 November Maguire was selected as ACC Golfer of the Month for November 2017, which is the eight time she has won the monthly award in her college golf career. On 27 November Maguire was named 2017 Global Golf Post Female Amateur of the Year. She was also chosen as a member of the Global Golf Post All-Star amateur team of 2017, the third year in a row that she has been selected.

2018
On 31 January, Maguire broke Lydia Ko's record for the most weeks at the top of the World Amateur rankings, with 131 weeks. On 28 February, Maguire was named as an honorary recipient of the ACC Weaver-James-Corrigan postgraduate scholarship, which is awarded to selected student-athletes who intend to pursue a graduate degree following completion of their undergraduate requirements.

On 14 April at the Liz Murphey Collegiate Classic in Athens, Georgia, Maguire broke the all-time ACC record of most even or under par rounds in a college career. Her record of 80 even or under par rounds (she eventually finished her college career with 87 such rounds, the second best in NCAA history) also breaks the Duke record held by Amanda Blumenherst.

On 23 April, Maguire claimed her third win of the 2017–18 college season by winning the ACC Championship for the third time in her career, which matches the all-time record of Amanda Blumenherst. She finished with a total of 210 and won on the third hole of a playoff against Duke teammate Jaravee Boonchant. She also helped Duke to win the ACC team title for the second year in a row. Maguire also matched the Duke 18-hole record for the ACC Championship with a five-under 67. It tied Brittany Lang (2004 on par 71) and Maria Garcia-Estrada (2000 on par 72). Her round of 67 also broke the ACC Championship course record at Grandover Resort. On 23 April Maguire was presented with the Duke University Lifetime Achievement Award.

On 3 May, Maguire broke the all-time record for most ACC Golfer of the Month awards when she was selected for the ninth time. On 4 May Maguire was voted the Atlantic Coast Conference Women's Golfer of the Year for the third time in her career. She was also chosen for the All-ACC Team for the fourth time in her career. On 8 May Maguire broke the all-time Duke University record of most rounds in the 60s. Her score of 65 at the 2018 NCAA Women's Regional Championship, held at the University Ridge Golf Course, Madison, Wisconsin, USA, was the 31st of her career in college golf, beating Amanda Blumenherst's record of 30. On 10 May, Maguire was inducted into Phi Beta Kappa, America's oldest academic honor society.

On 11 May, Maguire was awarded the ACC Plaque for Excellence, Scholarship and Athletics. Maguire's final 70.97 college career scoring average is the best in NCAA history for any female golfer with at least 100 rounds.

On 22 May, Maguire was selected for the USA Women's Golf Coaches Association (WGCA) All-Americans First Team. On 23 May Maguire was selected CoSIDA Academic All-District III for the second straight year. She was recognised for obtaining a 3.943 grade-point average along with a degree in psychology and a certificate in markets and management studies.

On 9 June, Maguire was selected to Golfweek First Team All-America for the fourth season in a row. On 13 June, Maguire selected on the CoSIDA Academic All-America® Women's At-Large Team for the second year in a row with a Grade Point Average of 3.94 or A. On 20 June, Maguire was named the ACC Women's Golf Scholar-Athlete of the Year for the second year in a row and was also named to the All-ACC Academic Team for the fourth year in a row.

On 4 July, Maguire was selected for the 2017-18 WGCA All-American Scholars Team which recognises academic excellence as well as athletic excellence, for the fourth year in a row, a Duke University record.

On 6 July, Maguire was selected on the annual ACC Honor Roll for the fourth year in a row. On 12 July Maguire was awarded the 2018 Edith Cummings Munson Golf Award by the Women's Golf Coaches Association (WGCA) for the second year in a row. Amateurgolf.com selected her as the second best female amateur golfer of the last ten years. Golfweek selected Maguire as the best women's college golfer of the last decade.

Professional career

2018
On 5 June 2018, Maguire turned professional. Both herself and her twin sister Lisa Maguire signed to singer Niall Horan's golf management company Modest! Golf and also signed sponsorship deals with Puma, Ping, Allianz and KPMG. She will be based in Scottsdale, Arizona. On 8 June, Maguire made her professional debut on the LPGA Tour at the ShopRite LPGA Classic in Galloway, New Jersey, USA. She finished in 15th place with rounds of 69, 67, 69, including the first eagle of her professional career, and received prize money of $24,891.00. Her ranking on the World Women's Golf Ranking at the start of her professional career before the tournament was 614. As of 11 June, her world ranking is 442, a huge jump of 172 places in a week. On 15 June, Maguire made her debut on the Symetra Tour at the Decatur-Forsyth Classic in Decatur, Illinois, USA. She finished in third place with rounds of 69, 68, 69, including the first hole-in-one of her professional career and received prize money of $6,574. Her first six rounds as a professional have all been in the 60s. As of 18 June, her world ranking is 414, a jump of 28 places from the previous week. On 23 November, Maguire made her professional debut on the Ladies European Tour at the Andalucia Costa Del Sol Open De España Femenino in La Quinta Golf Resort in Spain. She finished in 18th place with rounds of 71, 72, 73, 69 and received prize money of €4,575. On 20 December, Maguire secured her Category 5c status card for the 2019 Ladies European Tour by finishing 5th in the Qualifying Finals Lalla Aicha Tour School at Marrakesh, Morocco, with rounds of 68, 70, 70, 72, 67.

2019

On 1 April, Maguire moved into the top 300 on the world ranking list for the first time as a professional, after finishing fourth in the IOA Championship on the Symetra Tour. She led the tournament after two rounds. On 7 April Maguire won her first professional tournament at the Windsor Golf Classic in Windsor, California. Her total of 204 with rounds of 70, 69, 65 took her into a playoff which she won at the first hole with a birdie. She won prize money of $22,500. On 1 May, Maguire broke the course record at the LET Omega Dubai Moonlight Classic on the Faldo Course at Emirates Golf Club in Dubai. Her round of 64 was the lowest in her professional career. She finished the tournament in the top five. On 6 May Maguire won the U.S. Women's Open  qualifying tournament at Pinnacle Creek Country Club in Arizona, USA with rounds of 66, 68. On 11 May Maguire reached the playoff of the Symetra Tour IOA Invitational at Milton, Georgia. She finished in second place after the playoff. On 17 May, Maguire moved into the top 175 on the world ranking list for the first time as a professional, after winning the Symetra Classic held in Davidson, North Carolina. Her total of 206 with rounds of 70, 69, 67, gave her a five stroke lead and prize money of $26,250. She is ranked number 1 on the Symetra Tour Official Money List and number 1 on scoring averages with 69.789. This was the seventh time she carded a top-five finish in her last eight tournaments. Maguire's new world ranking of 174 means she has jumped 440 places since turning professional. On 6 October, Maguire secured her LPGA Tour card for the 2020 season by finishing seventh on the money list on the Symetra Tour. Her total Symetra Tour career prize money was $120,760. She joins her compatriot Stephanie Meadow, the first time in history Ireland has two professionals on the LPGA Tour.

2020

Maguire was ranked 100 on the LPGA Priority List for the 2020 season. On 23 January, Maguire made her LPGA Tour debut at the Gainbridge LPGA at Boca Rio in Boca Raton, Florida. On 9 February Maguire achieved her first top five finish as an LPGA professional with a fourth place in the ISPS Handa Vic Open at the 13th Beach Golf Links on the Bellarine Peninsula in Victoria, finishing just one shot off the lead. She won $52,000 and moved up 62 places in the world ranking list. On 13 September, Maguire recorded her highest ever placing in a professional golf major with 18th place in the ANA Inspiration at Rancho Mirage, California, U.S. This was also the highest placing in a professional golf major by a professional female golfer from the Republic of Ireland. As well as prize money of $39,726 the result pushed Maguire to number one place on the LPGA Putting Average rankings. Her world ranking is now 168, a rise of 446 places since she turned professional. Maguire ended the year ranked number one on the LPGA Putting Average statistics list with an average of 28.69 putts per round, the first Irish golfer to achieve first place and also the first alumna from Duke University to do so. She finished ahead of second place Inbee Park, the former world number one and seven-time major winner. She also secured her tour card for 2021 as well as finishing in the top 11 on the Tour for Driving Accuracy and Putts per GIR.

2021

On 17 April, Maguire achieved her highest placing in a LPGA Tour event and also the highest ever by any Irish female golfer, with joint second at the Lotte Championship, held in Kapolei, Oahu, Hawaii. She won her biggest-ever career prize money of $125,834 with rounds of 68, 67, 65, 67, including two eagles. Her score of 267 was the lowest tournament total in her professional career and her third round score of 65 was the lowest in her LPGA career. As a result, she broke into the top 100 on the Women's World Golf Rankings for the first time, ranked 93. On 10 June, Maguire equalled the tournament record lowest round score, with a 65 at the LPGA Mediheal Championship held at the Lake Merced Golf Club, Daly City, California, which meant she was the overnight leader. She finished the event in the top-10. She earned prize money of $29,513 and boosted her world ranking to its highest ever position of 88th place. On 20 June, Maguire had the biggest payday of her career at the Meijer LPGA Classic at the Blythefield Country Club, Grand Rapids, Michigan. She finished second to Nelly Korda with rounds of 65, 64, 70, 66, earning $214,000. Maguire's second round score of 64 was the lowest in her LPGA career. She was the overnight leader after both the first and second rounds. Her 72-hole score of 265 was the lowest tournament total in her professional career and actually beat the existing tournament record until Korda set a new one. This was her fourth top-10 finish of the season. As a result, her world ranking was boosted to its highest ever position of 63rd place. On 27 June, Maguire recorded her highest ever placing in a professional golf major with 15th place in the KPMG Women's PGA Championship, held at the Atlanta Athletic Club, Johns Creek, Georgia. This was also the highest placing in a professional golf major by a professional female golfer from the Republic of Ireland. Her finish earned her prize money of $58,839 and pushed her world golf ranking up to 60th place, her highest ever. On 11 July, Maguire finished in the top 15 of the rain-shortened Marathon Classic at Sylvania, Ohio. Her prize money was $25,099 and her world ranking rose to 59th place. On 25 July, Maguire shot the lowest ever final round score, by any golfer male or female, in the history of the 756 major grand slam tournaments held so far (c. 50,000 individual final rounds) with a 61 in the last round of The Evian Championship. It was also the joint lowest of any round in the history of all golf's major grand slam tournaments, either male or female (c. 200,000 individual rounds). The other two joint record holders are Lee Jeong-eun and Kim Hyo-joo. It was also Maguire's lowest ever round in her professional golf career. This helped her to finish tied for 6th, her first ever top-10 result in an LPGA major. It was also the highest placing in a professional golf major by a professional female golfer from the Republic of Ireland. Her prize money was $123,703 and her world golf ranking rose to 50th place, her highest ever. On 7 August Maguire participated in her second Olympic Games at the Kasumigaseki Country Club in Japan. She finished 23rd overall for a five under par total of 279, with scores of 71, 67, 70, 71. On 15 August, she achieved her sixth consecutive top 15 place on an LPGA Tour event by finishing 15th in the Trust Golf Women's Scottish Open at Dumbarnie Links, Fife. As a result, her world golf ranking rose to 48th place, her highest ever. She also passed the $1 million mark in career earnings. On 22 August, she achieved her seventh consecutive top 15 place at an LPGA Tour event by finishing 13th in the 2021 Women's British Open at Carnoustie Golf Links, Angus, Scotland. None of her last 29 rounds of golf have been over par. As a result, her world golf ranking rose to 43rd place, her highest ever. The following day, she was selected to represent Team Europe at the 2021 Solheim Cup. She is the first ever Irish representative to be selected. On 6 September 2021, Maguire broke the all-time rookie points record in either the Solheim Cup or the Ryder Cup with a total of 4.5 points (2 points better than anybody else in the 2021 Solheim Cup), which helped Europe to narrowly win the cup 15–13. On 11 November, Maguire broke both the tournament and course records at the Pelican Women's Championship in Belleair, Florida, US with a score of 62, the second lowest round of her professional career. She was the overnight leader for the fourth time on the 2021 LPGA Tour. Maguire finished the year as runner-up in the LPGA Rookie of the Year and 19th on the LPGA Money List with earnings of $885,141. She also secured her LPGA Tour card for the 2022 season. On 20 December, Maguire was named as the Irish Golf Writers’ Association Professional Player of the Year, only the second woman to be so honoured in the history of the award. In the end of year final Women's World Golf Rankings, Maguire achieved her highest ever position of 40th place, making her the 5th-best ranked European in those rankings.

2022

Maguire began her 2022 season at the Gainbridge LPGA at Boca Rio in Boca Raton, Florida, where she finished one stroke outside the top 20 places. As a result, she moved to number 37 on the Women's World Golf Ranking, her highest placing ever. On 5 February, Maguire became the first golfer from Ireland to win an LPGA tournament. At the LPGA Drive On Championship held in Fort Myers, Florida, USA, she gained a three-stroke victory over Lexi Thompson with rounds of 66, 65, 67 for an 18-under-par total of 198. She won $225,000, her biggest-ever prize money. As a result, she moved to number 20 on the world rankings, her highest placing ever. Her top-20 spot means she is the second-highest ranked European player in the world. Maguire has jumped 157 places on the rankings in the last 12 months. On 21 February, Maguire moved up to number 18 on the world rankings, her highest placing ever. On 5 June, Maguire achieved her highest ever placing in the U.S. Women's Open with 8th place at Pine Needles Lodge and Golf Club in Southern Pines, North Carolina. She also won the biggest purse of her career with $261,195. On 19 June, Maguire shot a final round 65 to get into a playoff with Jennifer Kupcho and Nelly Korda at the Meijer LPGA Classic. Kupcho won the title at the second sudden-death hole. Maguire received prize money of $196,847. On 7 August, Maguire achieved her highest place in a major, with joint fourth place in the AIG Women's Open at Muirfield in Scotland. Her final round of 66 was the lowest of the day, earning her prize money of $309,546, her biggest-ever purse. As a result, she moved to number 17 on the world rankings, her highest placing ever. Maguire finished the LPGA season winning her biggest ever prize money at the CME Group Tour Championship in Tiburon Golf Club, Naples, Florida, USA. Her second place to Lydia Ko earned her $550,000, giving her $1,812,813 total earnings from the LPGA for this season. As a result, Maguire moved to number 11 on the world rankings, her highest placing ever, and is the highest-ranked European player in the world. She also finished in the top-10 on the LPGA awards list for Player of the Year, for most money won, most tournaments won and for most top-10 finishes. Maguire finished her 2022 season with fourth place at the LET Tour Andalucia Costa Del Sol Open De España in Villa Padierna Golf Club, Spain. She also finished the season in the top-10 on the LET awards list for most money won, sand saves, lowest putting average per round and lowest stroke average. Maguire had ten top-10 finishes in all competitions worldwide in 2022, placing 1st, 2nd (twice), 4th (three times), 8th and 10th (three times).

Professional wins (3)

LPGA Tour (1)

LPGA Tour playoff record (0–1)

Symetra Tour wins (2)

Results in LPGA majors
Results not in chronological order before 2019 or in 2020.

LA = Low amateur

CUT = missed the half-way cut
NT = no tournament
"T" = tied

Summary

Most consecutive cuts made – 11 (2020 ANA – 2022 British Open, current)
Longest streak of top-10s – 1 (three time, current)

LPGA Tour career summary

^ Official as of 20 November 2022
*Includes matchplay and other tournaments without a cut.

Ladies European Tour career summary

Prize money (to end of 2022 season)
€654,109.

LPGA Epson/Symetra Tour career summary

Prize money (to end of 2022 season)
$120,760

World ranking
Position in Women's World Golf Rankings at the end of each calendar year.

Team appearances
Amateur
European Girls' Team Championship (representing Ireland): 2008, 2009 (winners), 2010, 2012
Junior Ryder Cup (representing Europe): 2008
Junior Solheim Cup (representing Europe): 2009, 2011
Vagliano Trophy (representing Great Britain & Ireland): 2009, 2011, 2015, 2017
Curtis Cup (representing Great Britain & Ireland): 2010, 2012 (winners), 2016 (winners)
Espirito Santo Trophy (representing Ireland): 2010, 2012, 2016
European Ladies' Team Championship (representing Ireland ): 2011, 2013

Professional
Solheim Cup (representing Europe): 2021 (winners)

Solheim Cup record

References

External links
 
 
 
 
 

Irish female golfers
LPGA Tour golfers
Ladies European Tour golfers
Winners of ladies' major amateur golf championships
Olympic golfers of Ireland
Golfers at the 2016 Summer Olympics
Golfers at the 2020 Summer Olympics
Solheim Cup competitors for Europe
Duke Blue Devils women's golfers
Sportspeople from County Cavan
Twin sportspeople
Irish twins
1994 births
Living people